2020 Mongolian First League (often referred to as the 2020 Mongolian 1st League) is Second-highest division of the Mongolia.

The competition started on July 2, as the match between Khan-Uul and Khovd Western.

The league ended on October 11 with the match between BCH Lions and Döchin Myangat United (DMU).

Participating Teams

BCH Lions
Khoromkhon FC
Khovd FC
Tuv Buganuud FC 
DMU FC
Aldariin Daychid FC
Khovd Western FC
Deren-2
Khökh Chononuud FC
Khan-Uul FC

Matches

Round 1
[Jul 2]
Khan-Uul               0-4 Khovd Western       
[Jul 3]
Tuv Buganuud           3-3 Aldariin Daychid      
[Jul 4]
BCH Lions              2-2 Khovd Club             
[Jul 5]
Khoromkhon             4-0 Deren-2                
[Jul 6]
Khukh Chononuud        0-2 DMU

Round 2
[Jul 15]
Khovd Western          1-1 Tuv Buganuud           
[Jul 16]
Aldariin Daychid       2-7 BCH Lions              
[Jul 17]
Khovd Club             3-0 Khukh Chononuud        
[Jul 18]
Deren-2                2-2 Khan-Uul               
[Jul 19]
DMU                    2-3 Khoromkhon

Round 3
[Jul 19]
BCH Lions              5-2 Khovd Western          
[Jul 20]
Khukh Chononuud        2-2 Aldariin Daychid       
[Jul 21]
Tuv Buganuud           2-0 Khan-Uul               
[Jul 22]
Khoromkhon             0-1 Khovd Club             
[Jul 23]
DMU                    7-0 Deren-2

Round 4
[Jul 25]
Khan-Uul               1-1 BCH Lions              
[Jul 26]
Khovd Western          1-6 Khukh Chononuud        
Aldariin Daychid       1-2 Khoromkhon             
Deren-2                1-5 Tuv Buganuud           
[Jul 27]
Khovd Club             1-1 DMU

Round 5
[Jul 31]
BCH Lions              1-0 Tuv Buganuud           
[Aug 1]
Khukh Chononuud        0-0 Khan-Uul               
Khoromkhon             4-0 Khovd Western          
[Aug 2]
DMU                    4-2 Aldariin Daychid       
Khovd Club             6-0 Deren-2

Round 6
[Aug 4]
Tuv Buganuud           2-1 Khukh Chononuud        
[Aug 5]
Khan-Uul               0-4 Khoromkhon             
Khovd Western          1-3 DMU                    
[Aug 8]
Aldariin Daychid      1-10 Khovd Club             
[Aug 10]
Deren-2                3-8 BCH Lions

Round 7
[Aug 6]
Khukh Chononuud        2-5 BCH Lions              
[Aug 9]
Khoromkhon             3-4 Tuv Buganuud           
DMU                    1-1 Khan-Uul               
[Aug 14]
Khovd Club             4-2 Khovd Western          
[Aug 15]
Aldariin Daychid       2-3 Deren-2

Round 8
[Aug 15]
BCH Lions              4-0 Khoromkhon             
Tuv Buganuud           2-0 DMU                    
[Aug 19]
Khan-Uul               0-6 Khovd Club             
Deren-2                3-4 Khukh Chononuud        
[Aug 20]
Khovd Western          2-4 Aldariin Daychid

Round 9
[Aug 22]
DMU                    3-5 BCH Lions              
[Aug 23]
Khoromkhon             4-2 Khukh Chononuud        
Khovd Club             1-2 Tuv Buganuud           
Aldariin Daychid       7-1 Khan-Uul               
[Aug 24]
Khovd Western          4-2 Deren-2

Round 10
[Aug 28]
Aldariin Daychid       2-3 Tuv Buganuud          
[Aug 29]
Khovd Western          5-0 Khan-Uul               
Khovd Club             1-2 BCH Lions              
[Aug 30]
Deren-2                1-4 Khoromkhon             
[Sep 21]
DMU                    5-3 Khukh Chononuud

Round 11
[Sep 1]
Khukh Chononuud        2-6 Khovd Club             
BCH Lions              5-3 Aldariin Daychid       
[Sep 2]
Khoromkhon             3-3 DMU                    
Tuv Buganuud           0-0 Khovd Western          
[Sep 3]
Khan-Uul               0-2 Deren-2

Round 12
[Sep 5]
Khovd Club             0-3 Khoromkhon             
[Sep 6]
Khovd Western          1-2 BCH Lions              
Khan-Uul               1-4 Tuv Buganuud           
Deren-2                1-1 DMU                    
[Sep 7]
Aldariin Daychid       3-2 Khukh Chononuud

Round 13
[Sep 11]
BCH Lions              5-3 Khan-Uul               
Tuv Buganuud           6-2 Deren-2                
[Sep 12]
Khukh Chononuud        1-3 Khovd Western          
DMU                    2-6 Khovd Club             
[Sep 13]
Khoromkhon             2-0 Aldariin Daychid

Round 14
[Sep 25]
Tuv Buganuud           3-3 BCH Lions              
Khan-Uul               2-0 Khukh Chononuud        
[Sep 26]
Khovd Western          0-0 Khoromkhon             
Aldariin Daychid       0-0 DMU                    
Deren-2                5-3 Khovd Club

Round 15
[Sep 29]
Khukh Chononuud        1-7 Tuv Buganuud           
Khoromkhon             8-0 Khan-Uul               
[Sep 30]
BCH Lions              8-2 Deren-2                
DMU                    1-6 Khovd Western          
[Oct 1]
Khovd Club             3-4 Aldariin Daychid

Round 16
[Oct 3]
Tuv Buganuud           2-3 Khoromkhon             
Khan-Uul               0-9 DMU                    
[Oct 4]
BCH Lions             11-2 Khukh Chononuud        
Khovd Western          2-4 Khovd Club             
Deren-2                0-1 Aldariin Daychid

Round 17
[Oct 6]
DMU                    5-3 Tuv Buganuud           
[Oct 7]
Khovd Club             7-0 Khan-Uul               
Aldariin Daychid       0-0 Khovd Western          
[Oct 8]
Khoromkhon             5-3 BCH Lions              
Khukh Chononuud        1-3 Deren-2

Round 18
[Oct 10]
Khan-Uul               1-5 Aldariin Daychid       
[Oct 11]
Khukh Chononuud       4-10 Khoromkhon             
Tuv Buganuud           0-2 Khovd Club             
Deren-2                4-3 Khovd Western          
BCH Lions              5-8 DMU

Final classification

 1.BCH Lions                   18  13  3  2  82-43  42  [P]  Promoted

 2.Khoromkhon                  18  13  2  3  62-27  41  [R]  Promotion Playoff
 - - - - - - - - - - - - - - - - - - - - - - - - - - -
 3.Khovd Club                  18  11  2  5  66-28  35
 4.Tuv Buganuud                18  10  4  4  49-30  34
 5.DMU                         18   8  5  5  57-42  29  [*]
 6.Aldariin Daychid            18   6  4  8  42-50  22  [N]
 7.Khovd Western               18   5  4  9  37-41  19
 8.Deren-2                     18   5  2 11  34-69  17  [P]

 9.Khukh Chononuud             18   2  2 14  33-72   8  [P]
 10.Khan-Uul                    18   1  4 13  12-72   7       Relegated

References

3
Sports leagues established in 2020